The Kuberry Rocks are a small area of exposed rock at the north end of the Coulter Heights. They were mapped by the United States Geological Survey from surveys and U.S. Navy air photos, 1959–65, and were named by the Advisory Committee on Antarctic Names for Richard W. Kuberry, a geomagnetist/seismologist at Byrd Station, 1969–70.

References

Rock formations of Marie Byrd Land